Sport Club Internacional is a Brazilian football club from Porto Alegre.

Internacional may also refer to:

Sports

Brazil
 Associação Atlética Internacional (Bebedouro), Brazilian football club from Bebedouro
 Associação Atlética Internacional (Limeira), Brazilian football club from Limeira
 Esporte Clube Internacional, Brazilian football club from Santa Maria
 Internacional Foot-Ball Club, Brazilian football club from Curitiba
 SC Internacional (SP), Brazilian football club from São Paulo

Equatorial Guinea

 Estadio Internacional, Equatoguinean stadium located in Malabo

Spain
 Internacional de Madrid CF, Spanish football club from Madrid

Entertainment
 Caracol TV Internacional, Colombia
 RTP Internacional, Portugal
 SIC Internacional, Portugal
 TVE Internacional, Spain
 Internacional (album)

See also
 Inter (disambiguation)
 Inter Milan (disambiguation)
 International (disambiguation)
 Internazionale (disambiguation)